is an inhabited island located in Ise Bay off the east coast of central Honshu, Japan. It is administered as part of the city of Toba in Mie Prefecture. It is the largest of the outlying islands of Toba.

The name of Tōshijima appears in early documents, such as the Man'yōshū and Wamyō Ruijushō, and was a base for pirates led by Kuki Yoshitaka in the Sengoku period.

On November 1, 1954, the island became part of the city of Toba.
The economy of the island is based on commercial fishing, aquaculture and tourism.

References
 Saishin-Nihon-chizu - Atlas of Japan, Imidas Shueisha, Tokyo 1990

External links

Toba City home page
Matsuri festival

Islands of Mie Prefecture